There are less than forty hospitals located in the City of  Montreal, Quebec, Canada. Many of them are also medical research facilities and teaching schools affiliated with universities.

McGill University affiliated hospitals
Lakeshore General Hospital
Jewish General Hospital
St. Mary's Hospital
Douglas Mental Health University Institute
Shriners Hospital for Children

McGill University Health Centre
GLEN super hospital
Royal Victoria Hospital 
Montreal Children's Hospital  
Montreal Chest Institute 
Montreal General Hospital
Allan Memorial Institute (contains MGH's outpatient psychiatry)
Montreal Neurological Hospital
Hôpital de Lachine

*The term GLEN refers to the super hospital site on Decarie

Université de Montréal affiliated hospitals
Centre hospitalier de l'Université de Montréal
Hôpital de Verdun
Hopital Notre-Dame
Hôpital Maisonneuve-Rosemont
Hôpital du Sacré-Coeur de Montréal
 Hôpital en santé mentale Albert-Prévost
Centre hospitalier universitaire Sainte-Justine
Institut de cardiologie de Montréal
Institut universitaire en santé mentale de Montréal
Institut Philippe-Pinel de Montréal
 Hôpital Fleury
 Hôpital Santa-Cabrini
 Hôpital de LaSalle
 Hôpital Jean-Talon
 Hôpital Rivière-des-Prairies

Closed hospitals 
Hôtel-Dieu de Montréal, (1645-2017), currently houses administrative offices and COVID-19 test site
Hôpital Saint-Luc (1908-2017)
Montreal Chinese Hospital, currently a long term care home for Chinese speakers since the 1970s
 Doctor's Hospital (1949-1971), opened with 25 beds, high of 65 beds around 1965. Addresses listed as 6481 Cote-des-Neiges until 1960, 6733 thereafter. Known to hire immigrant and Jewish doctors at a time when many hospitals refused to.
Grey Nuns' Hospital (1695-1880)
 Herbert Reddy Memorial Hospital (1946-1970s), Reddy Memorial Hospital (1970s-1997)
 Western Hospital of Montreal (XXXX-1924) 
 Montreal Homeopathic Hospital (1894-1951) 
Queen Elizabeth Hospital of Montreal (1951-1995), currently a family medicine clinic 
Hôpital de la Miséricorde (1853-1974), was renamed Hôpital Jacques-Viger and operated as a long-term care hospital from 1975 to 2012, vacant since 2012
Hôpital Ste-Jeanne-d'Arc (1920-1996), established in 1919 as Hôpital Français
Hôpital Bellechasse(1962-1997), Transformed into social housing.

See also
List of hospitals in Canada

References

Montreal
Montreal
Hospitals
Hospitals in Montreal